The 51 Special Action Group is a special response unit of the National Security Guards (NSG) of India. It was raised by the Cabinet Secretariat under the National Security Guard Act of 1985.

The Special Action Group (SAG) comprises 54% of the National Security Guards. The 51 SAG forms the offensive arm, with personnel drawn from the Indian Army. The 51 SAG is tasked with counter-terrorism operations, while the 52 SAG is trained and equipped for counter-hijack operations.

Mission
51 Special Action Group's mission is part of the NSG's overall mission to neutralize specific terrorist threats in vital installations or any given area, handle hijack situations involving piracy in the air and on the land, engage and neutralize terrorists in specific situations, and to rescue hostages in kidnap situations.

Composition
The unit is the smallest combat unit in the SAG counter-terrorist operations, and is called a hit. It has five members: two pairs, or partners and a technical support member. Four hits make a team which is under the command of a captain/team commander. The number of hits used for an intervention job depends on its complexity and the magnitude of the operation.

Recently, operational hubs have been raised in Metro cities: Mumbai, Chennai, Hyderabad, Kolkata and Gandhinagar, apart from its headquarters at Manesar (Haryana), near the capital New Delhi.

Equipment
HK MP5 and its variants such as the MP5SD3, MP5SD6, MP5K, and MP5-N
 Beretta AR70/90
Glock 19
Sig Sauer P226
SIG SG 550 and its variants
Beretta 92
Franchi SPAS-15 12 gauge combat shotgun
PSG-1 sniper rifle
MSG-90 sniper rifle

Operations carried out
Though it is not possible to narrate all the operations carried out by NSG but the summary of important surgical operations carried out by NSG (51 SAG) are given below:

Operation Cactus – Commandos were mobilized for the 1988 Maldives coup d'état operations in Male, Maldives.
Operation Mouse Trap – Commandos were deployed in District Taran Taaran (Punjab). More than 25 militants were killed and a large number of weapons & ammunition were recovered.
Operation Agni Baan – Punjab terrorists were holed up inside a house in Baroda. 2 terrorists were killed and their weapons recovered.
Operation Ghost Buster – 51 SAG was deployed with SIT for search and strike missions after the assassination of Rajiv Gandhi.
Operation Sudarshan – 51 SAG was deployed at Ayodhya during Demolition of the Babri Masjid 
Operation Winter Storm – 51 SAG along with supporting elements were moved on 27 Oct 93 to Srinagar to flush out militants from Hazratbal Shrine. Operations were called off after a prolonged siege of almost a month though the final preparations for assault had been made.
Operation Vajrashakti in Akshardham Temple – 51 SAG was flown to rescue hostages held by terrorist in Akshardham Temple Gandhinagar. This was the first operation in which two commandos of 51 SAG attained martyrdom. All the militants were killed with no casualties to hostages & damage to the temple.
Operation Trident, Black Tornado and Cyclone – Recently held operations to flush out the terrorists and rescue hostages post multiple attacks across Mumbai. Major Sandeep Unnikrishnan & Havaldar Gajender Singh made their supreme sacrifice while combating the terrorists.
Operation Dhangu – The Army justified the deployment of 51 SAG (NSG) in the operation against the six terrorists at the Pathankot airbase, saying that the three service chiefs had taken the call jointly so that the elite combat force could deal with any hostage crisis in the airbase which had around 3,000 family members of IAF personnel and 23 trainees from four foreign countries at the time of the attack. Commander of the Army's Western Command Lt Gen K J Singh said the 51 SAG (NSG) was deployed as it is a force specially trained to deal with a hostage crisis. Apart from family members, 23 trainees from Afghanistan, Nigeria, Sri Lanka and Myanmar were at the airbase when terrorists struck. Singh said the strategic forward airbase of the IAF at Pathankot remained fully functional all through the 'Operation Dhangu', the codename given to the mission to eliminate the terrorists. On 3 January, when two terrorists had entered the barracks inside the airbase, six IAF personnel were stuck on the first floor of the building, Lt Gen Singh said. The commandos rappelled down to the building roof, broke the window on the first floor and evacuated IAF men. Thereafter the building was demolished with the help of IEDs to neutralise the terrorists.

References

Special forces of India
Specialist law enforcement agencies of India